The 2018 Formula Renault Eurocup is a multi-event motor racing championship for open wheel, formula racing cars held across Europe. The championship features drivers competing in 2 litre Formula Renault single seat race cars that conform to the technical regulations for the championship. The 2018 season is the 28th Formula Renault Eurocup season organized by the Renault Sport and the third season as the main category of the World Series by Renault. The series will visit ten circuits around the Europe, including Monaco.

Teams and drivers
In 2018 the series was scheduled to feature the same nine teams as in previous year. But Mark Burdett Motorsport wasn't able to appear on the grid.

Driver changes
 French F4 Championship champion Arthur Rougier and SMP F4 Championship driver Vladimiros Tziortzis joined Fortec Motorsports. BRDC British Formula 3 Championship driver Jordan Cane was expected to make his Eurocup debut with Fortec but later he aborted this plan. While Raúl Guzmán made his switch to Fortec from R-ace GP. Aleksey Korneev left the team to join 2018 Blancpain GT Series Endurance Cup.
 Euroformula Open Championship driver Eliseo Martínez and French F4 Championship driver Christian Muñoz joined AVF by Adrián Vallés. Henrique Chaves moved to the 2018 European Le Mans Series. Gregoire Saucy and Thomas Randle left the team.
 Richard Verschoor, who raced with MP Motorsport switched to Josef Kaufmann Racing and was joined by karting champion and Toyota Racing Series race winner Clément Novalak.
 Aleksandr Smolyar made his racing debut with Tech 1 Racing. He was joined by former Fortec Motorsports and MP Motorsport drivers Frank Bird and Neil Verhagen respectively. Gabriel Aubry graduated to the 2018 GP3 Series, leaving his Tech 1 seat vacant.
 F4 British Championship runner-up Oscar Piastri made his Eurocup debut with Arden Motorsport. He was joined by Aleksandr Vartanyan, who made his switch from JD Motorsport, and 2017 CIK-FIA European OK karting champion Sami Taoufik.
 Christian Lundgaard graduated from Spanish F4 Championship and SMP F4 Championship as champion in both championships with MP Motorsport. Alex Peroni switched to MP Motorsport for his second Eurocup campaign after leaving Fortec Motorsports. They were joined by Max Defourny, who raced two seasons with R-ace GP.
 French F4 Championship runner-up Victor Martins joined R-ace GP. He was joined by former Tech 1 Racing driver Max Fewtrell. Charles Milesi, who raced with R-ace GP in the 2017 Formula Renault 2.0 Northern European Cup and in the four rounds of the Eurocup made his full-time switch to the series. Logan Sargeant moved from ADAC Formula 4 Championship to R-ace GP.
 Italian F4 Championship driver Lorenzo Colombo raced with JD Motorsport. Thomas Maxwell and Najiy Razak switched from Tech 1 and Fortec respectively to join JD Motorsport.

Calendar
The provisional calendar for the 2018 season was announced on 25 September 2017. The series will return to Hockenheimring in its schedule. While Pau Grand Prix will be not present in the 2018 calendar. On 29 October the calendar was slightly altered, but featured the same ten circuits.

Results

Championship standings

Drivers' championship

Teams' championship
Only two-best cars are eligible to score points in the teams' championship.

Footnotes

References

External links
 

Formula Renault Eurocup
Formula Renault Eurocup
Eurocup
Renault Eurocup